Stuart Harrison Young (born 6 July 1938) is a former English cricketer. Young was a left-handed batsman who bowled right-arm fast. He was born at Blackhall, County Durham.

Young made his debut for Durham against the Lancashire Second XI in the 1956 Minor Counties Championship. He played minor counties cricket for Durham from 1956 to 1972, making 108 Minor Counties Championship appearances. He made his List A debut against Hertfordshire in the 1964 Gillette Cup. He made four further List A appearances, the last of which came against Oxfordshire in the 1972 Gillette Cup. In his five List A matches, he scored 38 runs at an average of 12.66, with a high score of 22. With the ball, he took 12 wickets at a bowling average of 9.66, with best figures of 4/13.

He also played first-class cricket for the Minor Counties. His first-class debut came against the touring Indians in 1959. He made two further first-class appearances for the team, against the touring South Africans in 1960, and the touring West Indians in 1969. In his three first-class matches, he scored 16 runs at an average of 8.00, with a high score of 14. With the ball, he took 12 wickets at an average of 24.08, with best figures of 4/44.

References

External links
Stuart Young at ESPNcricinfo
Stuart Young at CricketArchive

1938 births
Living people
People from Blackhall Colliery
Cricketers from County Durham
English cricketers
Durham cricketers
Minor Counties cricketers